The Mightiest Machine is a  science fiction novel by American writer John W. Campbell, Jr. The novel was originally serialized in 5 parts in Astounding Stories magazine   from December 1934 to April 1935, and was published in book form in 1947 by The Hadley Publishing Co. in an edition of 1,200 copies. Campbell was a leading figure in the Golden Age of Science Fiction.

Plot introduction
The story is the first to feature Campbell's hero Aarn Munro. This space opera novel concerns the harnessing of energy from the sun and encounters with aliens who turn out not to be truly alien at all. It also touches on the legends of ancient civilizations on earth, Mu in this case, and what may have happened to them.

Reception
Astounding reviewer P. Schuyler Miller described the 1947 edition as "perhaps the climax of the super-physics school of science fiction which 'Skylark' Smith had started." Everett F. Bleiler identified the novel as the paradigm of "the Campbell hard space opera," noting its "great quantity of fanciful and ingenious scientific extrapolations, fictional weaknesses, and polarized social simplistics that regard genocide with equanimity."

Technology  
The novel is ground breaking in its inclusion of a wide range of advanced technology including space travel concepts such as Artificial gravity, Faster-than-light travel with Warp drive, and an early version of travel through Wormholes as important facets of the story. The protagonist also invents and employs devices such as Infrared vision googles and miniature remotely piloted surveillance drones.

Trivia 
The novel contains the phrase "…to infinity and beyond…": "Her crew on that trip that was to lead them to infinity and beyond consisted of Aarn Munro, Carlisle,…"

References

Sources

External links 
 

1947 American novels
American science fiction novels
Novels first published in serial form
Works originally published in Analog Science Fiction and Fact